Baramati taluka is a taluka in Baramati subdivision of Pune district of state of Maharashtra in India.

Location:

Baramati Tehsil belongs to western part of Maharashtra. It belongs to Pune division. It is located 100 km towards east from district headquarters Pune. 240 km from state capital Mumbai towards east. Baramati tehsil has its head quarter that is Baramati town. Baramati tehsil lies between 18º04΄ to 18°32΄ north latitudes and 74° 26΄to 74° 69΄ east longitudes. It is located at altitude of 550 meters above means sea level.  

Area of Baramati tehsil is 1382 sq.km. One hundred sixteen main villages and more than these sub-villages are located in tahsil region. Total population of study area is 3,75,185 out of this 1,93,451 are males while 1,81,734 are females. The rural population of tehsil is 3,55,841 (94.84%). Baramati tehsil is bounded by Phaltan tahsil towards south, Daund tahsil towards north, Malshiras tehsil towards east, Indapur tahsil towards east and purandar tahsil to west side.

Climate and Rainfall:

The climate of the Baramati Tehsil is slightly different in irrigated and non-irrigated area. The winter season is from December to about the middle of February followed by summer season which last up to May. June to September is the south-west monsoon season, whereas October and November constitute the post-monsoon season. The mean minimum temperature is about 12 °C and means temperature is about 39 °C. The average annual rainfall for the period 2001 to 2012 of Baramati Tahsil was 502 mm. The rainfall analysis indicates study area is drought area (DPAP) 

Geomorphology:

The Baramati Tehsil is an eastern belt of Pune district with a rolling topography and the low hills sinking slowly in to the plains with relatively broader valleys. Therefore, the physiography of the tahsil has given rise to two major characteristic land forms namely; (1) the plateau and (2) the plains. The soil of the study area is mainly derived from the Deccan basalts. They are generally fertile except in hilly region. The main types of soil found in study area are black, brownish and gray or white. The soil along the Nira River area is black in colour, fine texture and fertile. The main crop in the Nira River side area is sugarcane. As we approach towards the plateau area the soil graded into coarse textured grayish to white coloured calcrete rich soil. The Tahsil area underlain by the basaltic lava flows of upper Cretaceous to lower Eocene age. Basaltic lava occupies more than 95%.

See also
 Talukas in Pune district

References

Talukas in Pune district
Talukas in Maharashtra